The Divecha, or Davecha is a subcaste of the Koli caste found in the Indian state of Gujarat.

Origin and distribution 
The Divecha Kolis are called Divecha because they originally hailed from Diu in Saurashtra region of Gujarat. Divecha Kolis are spread over in Porbander, Jamnagar, Mangrol and Veraval districts.

Classification 
The Divecha Kolis are classified as an Other Backward Class (OBC) caste by the Government of Gujarat.

Clans 
 Jhala
 Makwana
 Bhalia
 Parmar
 Chudasama
 Solanki
 Chauhan
 Vala
 Pandit
 Chavda
 Jethwa

Organisations 
 Koli Divecha Gnati Mandal

References 

Koli subcastes